Teckentrup is a surname. Notable people with the surname include:

Aretha Teckentrup, UK-based mathematician
 (born 1969), German artist, author, and book illustrator
Ralf Teckentrup (born 1957), German aviation executive